Natalie Kanyapak Phoksomboon (born January 31, 1991) or Natalie Gnehm, is a Thai-Swiss model and beauty pageant titleholder, who won Miss Thailand World 2013. She was crowned Miss Thailand World 2013 on April 9, 2013 by Vanessa Herrmann, Miss Thailand World 2012.

Career

Miss Thai Europa 2011
Phoksomboon was crowned Miss Thai Europa on March 4, 2011 by Sirirat Rueangsri, Miss Thailand World 2010, as the most beautiful Thai origin in Europe. Sirirat Rueangsri was the inspiration for Phoksomboon to apply for Miss Thailand World pageant in 2013.

Miss World 2013
She represented Thailand in Miss World 2013 in Bali, Indonesia. She placed 1st Runner-up for Multimedia Award, the first time for Thailand to place in the top 3 for the Multimedia Award at Miss World.

References

External links
www.missthailandworld.net Miss Thailand World Official Website
http://www.blick.ch/people-tv/schweiz/natalies-mutter-ist-thailaenderin-ihr-vater-schweizer-zuercherin-ist-miss-thailand Blick Zeitung Schweiz
http://women.horoworld.com/-miss-thailand-world-2013 Woman Honorworld
 

Living people
1991 births
Natalie Kanyapak Phoksomboon
Swiss people of Thai descent
Miss World 2013 delegates
People from Wetzikon
Natalie Kanyapak Phoksomboon
Miss Thailand World